Torre Faro is a  of the  of Messina in the Province of Messina, Sicily, southern Italy. It is a seaside village near the Ganzirri Lake and on its territory it hosts the Pylons of Messina.

History

From 1959 to 1961 on Torre faro Circuit tokk place the Messina Grand Prix (Italian: Gran Premio di Messina) a Formula Junior motor race held at Ganzirri Lake circuit (6,200 metres) in Messina, Italy, organized by the Automobile Club d'Italia. The race formed part of the Italian Formula Junior Championship.

Constructions of world interest

The Pylon of Torre Faro is one of the disused pylons of the 220 kV high voltage power line which for thirty years, from 1955 to 1985, crossed the Strait of Messina between Calabria and Sicily. With its height of 235 m it is one of the tallest buildings in Italy.

In the period of its use, the engineer Riccardo Morandi had designed two towers for anchoring high voltage cables, called Torri Morandi (Morabdi Towers). Even this structure has not been demolished and is now housed in the Torre Faro car park.

Gallery

See also
 Faro Point
 Pylons of Messina
 Strait of Messina
 Strait of Messina Bridge
 Ganzirri Lake
 Messina Grand Prix
 Peix Nicolau

References

External links
 The Village of Torre Faro at Italia in dettaglio

Frazioni of the Metropolitan City of Messina